A vocation  is an occupation to which a person is specially drawn or for which she/he is suited, trained, or qualified.

Vocation may also refer to:

Vocation, Alabama, a community in the United States
Vocation (band), a Swedish trio
"Vocation" (poem), a poem by Rabindranath Tagore